Hyland Neil "Hank" Nelson  (21 October 1937 – 17 February 2012) was one of Australia's foremost historians of the Pacific, particularly Papua New Guinea. His interest in the region began in 1966 when he took a teaching position at the Administrative College of Papua New Guinea and later the University. He lived in Papua New Guinea for seven years and studied the period of Japanese occupation, which led to several publications.

He worked on several displays and archival material at the Australian War Memorial about the war in Papua New Guinea, as well as films and radio documentaries. He was Emeritus Professor and Visiting Fellow at the Australian National University's Research School of Pacific and Asian Studies (RSPAS) until his death from cancer in February 2012.

Bibliography

Books

Edited books

References

External links
Silence broken on Australia's worst maritime disaster
Papua New Guinea upheaval comes as no surprise
Review of Chased by the Sun

1937 births
2012 deaths
Academic staff of the Australian National University
Australian historians
Fellows of the Academy of the Social Sciences in Australia
Historians of Oceania
Historians of the Pacific
Members of the Order of Australia
University of Melbourne alumni
University of Papua New Guinea alumni
Academic staff of the University of Papua New Guinea
20th-century Australian historians